The Fil-sham controversy refers to a player eligibility issue which affected the Philippine Basketball Association (PBA), the top-flight and professional basketball league in the Philippines in the early 2000s. The eligibility of certain Filipinos with foreign heritage to play in the league has been disputed which led the PBA to place more restriction on Filipinos born overseas and/or of foreign descent.

Background
The Philippine Basketball Association (PBA) saw an influx of Filipino players of foreign descent or Filipino-foreigners in the late-1990s. The dissolution of the Metropolitan Basketball Association in 2002, meant that PBA was the only league where Filipino-foreigners wanting to play in the Philippines could play. Many of these players were Filipino-Americans, who were also referred to as "Fil-ams". Players who were alleged to have falsified proof of their Filipino heritage were pejoratively branded as "Fil-shams".

One early notable case was that of Sonny Alvarado, the top-overall pick in the 1999 PBA draft who claimed to be Filipino and Puerto Rican descent, who went on to becoming a key player for the Tanduay Rhum Masters. Alvarado claims Filipino heritage from his mother. In September 1999, Senator Robert Jaworski called for an inquiry to look into Filipino-foreigners who may have falsified their Filipino citizenship documents responding to allegations raised by his colleague Robert Barbers. Alvarado was among those implicated but was cleared in January 2000. However the Bureau of Immigration reopened Alvarado's case and ordered for his deportation after concluding that he had falsified his mother's citizenship documents. Two of Tanduay's semifinal games in the 2000 PBA All-Filipino Cup which featured Alvarado were voided as a consequence.

The issue persisted in the early 2000s, with the eligibility of certain Filipino-foreigners to play in the PBA was put into question particularly their heritage by locally based Filipino players. In 2002, the PBA Players' Association, led by Jojo Lastimosa in a Senate inquiry led by Barbers, claimed that ten out of 25 Filipino-foreigners playing in the PBA at that time were fake though the group did not publicly disclosed the identities of the players during the inquiry. PBA commissioner Noli Eala formed a five-member committee to tackle the issue which has been attributed to the declining popularity of the league.

Associated players
The following players have been implicated with the controversy.

Notes

Aftermath and legacy
The Tanduay Rhum Masters, who signed in Sonny Alvarado in 1999, sold its franchise to FedEx Express (now Barako Bull Energy) in 2001. Eventually some of the Filipino-foreigners were able to prove their eligibility. As a response the PBA required Filipino-foreigners born outside the Philippines aspiring to join the PBA documents from the Bureau of Immigration (BI) and the Department of Justice (DOJ) affirming their Filipino heritage as early as the PBA Developmental League. A quota on foreign-born Filipinos were also imposed.

This led to peculiar cases such as CJ Perez who played high school and college basketball in the Philippines but was considered as a Filipino-foreigner since he was born in Hong Kong, and the Ganuelas-Rosser brothers Matt and Brandon. Matt, the older of the two did not have to secure documents from the BI and DOJ since he was born in Olongapo while the younger brother had to since he was born in the United States.

The PBA relaxed its rules on foreign-born Filipinos in November 2021, only requiring them a Philippine passport to join the PBA draft.

References

Sports scandals in the Philippines
Basketball controversies
Sport and nationality
Philippine Basketball Association